Jerko Matulić (born 20 April 1990) is a Croatian handball player.

He participated at the 2017 World Men's Handball Championship.

References

1990 births
Living people
People from Supetar
Croatian male handball players
Expatriate handball players in Poland
Croatian expatriate sportspeople in France
Croatian expatriate sportspeople in Poland
RK Zagreb players
Wisła Płock (handball) players
Competitors at the 2013 Mediterranean Games
Mediterranean Games silver medalists for Croatia
Mediterranean Games medalists in handball